The following are the scheduled events of association football (soccer) for the year 2021 throughout the world.

Events

Men's national teams

FIFA
 22 July – 7 August: Football at the 2020 Summer Olympics – Men's tournament in 
 : 
 : 
 :  
 4th: 
 19 – 29 August: 2021 FIFA Beach Soccer World Cup in 
 : 
 : 
 : 
 4th: 
 12 September – 3 October: 2021 FIFA Futsal World Cup in 
 : 
 : 
 :  
 4th: 
 30 November – 18 December: 2021 FIFA Arab Cup in 
 : 
 : 
 : 
 4th:

AFC

AFF
 5 December – 1 January 2022: 2020 AFF Championship in 
 : 
 : 
 :

CAFA
 19 – 23 November: 2021 CAFA U-15 Championship in  Dushanbe
 : 
 : 
 : 
4th:

SAFF
 1 – 16 October: 2021 SAFF Championship in 
 : 
 : 
 : 
 4th:

WAFF
 4 – 12 October: 2021 WAFF U-23 Championship in 
 : 
 : 
 : 
 : 
 20 November – 1 December: 2021 WAFF U-18 Championship in 
 : 
 :

UAFA
 20 – 29 May: 2021 Arab Futsal Cup in 
 : 
 : 
 : 
 : 
 20 June – 6 July: 2021 Arab Cup U-20 in 
 : 
 : 
 : 
 :

CAF
 16 January – 7 February: 2020 African Nations Championship in 
 : 
 : 
 : 
 4th: 
 14 February – 6 March: 2021 Africa U-20 Cup of Nations in 
 : 
 : 
 : 
 4th: 
 23 – 29 May: 2021 Africa Beach Soccer Cup of Nations in 
 : 
 : 
 : 
 4th:

CECAFA
 17 – 31 July: 2021 CECAFA U-23 Challenge Cup in 
 : 
 : 
 : 
 4th:

COSAFA
 7 – 18 July: 2021 COSAFA Cup in  Port Elizabeth
 : 
 : 
 : 
 4th: 
 1 December –: 2021 COSAFA Under-17 Championship in 
 : 
 : 
 : 
 4th:

UNAF
 18 – 24 January: 2021 UNAF U-17 Tournament in 
 : 
 : 
 : 
 8 – 17 November: 2021 UNAF U-20 Tournament in 
 : 
 : 
 : 
 4th:

WAFU
 5 – 18 January: 2021 WAFU Zone B U-17 Tournament in 
 : 
 : 
 : 
 4th: 
 5 – 13 February: 2021 WAFU Zone A U-17 Tournament in 
 : 
 : 
 : 
 :

CONCACAF
 3 – 9 May: 2021 CONCACAF Futsal Championship in 
 : 
 : 
 : 
 4th: 
 3 – 6 June: 2021 CONCACAF Nations League Finals in 
 : 
 : 
 : 
 4th: 
 10 July – 1 August: 2021 CONCACAF Gold Cup in 
 : 
 : 
 : 
 :

CONMEBOL
 13 June – 10 July: 2021 Copa América in 
 : 
 : 
 : 
 4th:

UEFA
 : 
 : 
 : 
 : 
 11 June – 11 July: UEFA Euro 2020 in 11 European countries (Final in )
 : 
 : 
 : 
 : 
 6 – 10 October: 2021 UEFA Nations League Finals in 
 : 
 : 
 : 
 4th:

Invitational
 23 – 29 March: 2021 Three Nations Cup in 
 : 
 : 
 :  Kyrgyzstan U23
 26 – 29 May: 2021 Valeri Lobanovsky Memorial Tournament in 
 : 
 : 
 : 
 1 – 10 June: 2020 Baltic Cup in  Vilnius,  Riga and  Tallinn
 : 
 : 
 : 
 2 – 7 September: 2021 Three Nations Cup in 
 : 
 : 
 : 
 8 – 19 November: 2021 Four Nations Football Tournament in 
 : 
 : 
 : 
 4th: 
 8 – 13 December–: 2021 Copa Raúl Coloma Rivas in 
 : 
 : 
 : 
 4th:

Women's national teams

FIFA
 21 July – 6 August: Football at the 2020 Summer Olympics – Women's tournament in 
 : 
 : 
 : 
 4th:

AFC

CAFA
 11 – 17 June: 2021 CAFA U-20 Women's Championship in  Dushanbe
 : 
 : 
 : 
 4th: 
 30 June – 9 July: 2021 CAFA U-17 Women's Championship in  Dushanbe
 : 
 : 
 : 
 4th:

SAFF
 11 – 22 December: 2021 SAFF U-19 Women's Championship in  Dhaka
 : 
 : 
 : 
 4th:

UAFA
 24 August – 6 September: 2021 Arab Women's Cup in 
 : 
 : 
 : 
 :

CAF

CECAFA
 30 October – 9 November: 2021 CECAFA Women's U20 Championship in 
 : 
 : 
 : 
 4th:

COSAFA
 28 September – 9 October: 2021 COSAFA Women's Championship in  Port Elizabeth
 : 
 : 
 : 
 4th:

Invitational
 17 – 23 February: 2021 Turkish Women's Cup in 
 : 
 : 
 :  CSKA Moscow
 4th: 
 18 – 23 February: 2021 Malta International Women's Football Tournament in 
 : 
 : 
 : 
 4th: 
 18 – 24 February: 2021 'Three Nations, One Goal' Cup in  Brussels,  Aachen and  Venlo
 : 
 : 
 : 
 18 – 24 February: 2021 SheBelieves Cup in 
 : 
 : 
 : 
 4th: 
 5 – 11 April: 2021 Three Nations Cup in 
 : 
 : 
 : 
 7 – 12 April: Four Nation Tournament in 
 : 
 : 
 : 
 4th: 
 8 – 14 June: Bansko Pirin Women's Cup in 
 : 
 : 
 : 
 10 – 13 June: 2020 Baltic Women's Cup in  Alytus
 : 
 : 
 : 
 4th: 
 10 – 15 June: Three Nations Training Tournament in  Bohuslän
 : 
 : 
 : 
 27 – 29 June: 2020 Baltic Women's U19 Cup in  Tallinn
 : 
 : 
 : 
 25 November – 1 December: 2021 International Women's Football Tournament of Manaus in 
 : 
 : 
 : 
 4th:

Club continental champions

Men

Women

National leagues

UEFA

AFC

CAF

CONCACAF

CONMEBOL

OFC

Non-FIFA

Domestic cups

UEFA

AFC

CAF

CONCACAF

CONMEBOL

OFC

Non-FIFA

Women's leagues

UEFA

AFC

CAF

CONCACAF

CONMEBOL

OFC

Non-FIFA

Women's Domestic cup

UEFA

AFC

CAF

CONCACAF

CONMEBOL

OFC

Non-FIFA

Second, third, fourth, and fifth leagues

UEFA

AFC

CAF

CONCACAF

CONMEBOL

OFC

Non-FIFA

Women's second, third and fourth leagues

UEFA

AFC

CAF

CONCACAF

CONMEBOL

OFC

Non-FIFA

Men's university leagues

CONCACAF

Women's university leagues

CONCACAF

Youth leagues

UEFA

AFC

CAF

CONCACAF

CONMEBOL

OFC

Non-FIFA

Deaths

January

 1 January – 
 Clint Boulton, 72, English footballer (Port Vale, Torquay United).
 Bernard Guignedoux, 73, French football player (Paris Saint-Germain, Monaco) and manager (Valenciennes).
 2 January – 
 Cléber Eduardo Arado, 48, Brazilian footballer (Kyoto Purple Sanga, Coritiba), COVID-19.
 Miquel Ferrer, 89, Spanish footballer (FC Barcelona, CD Condal, Real Oviedo).
 Ryder Mofokeng, 68, South African football player (Kaizer Chiefs).
 Yuri Saukh, 69, Russian football player (SKA Rostov, CSKA Moscow, Soviet Union national team) and manager.
 5 January –
 Colin Bell, 74, English footballer (Bury, Manchester City, national team).
 Brandãozinho, 90, Brazilian footballer (Palmeiras, Celta de Vigo).
 Tyberii Korponai, 62, Ukrainian football player and manager (Karpaty Lviv, Zakarpattia Uzhhorod, Kremin Kremenchuk).
 6 January –
 Mircea Bolba, 59, Romanian football player (Politehnica Timișoara, Bihor Oradea) and manager (Olimpia Satu Mare).
 Ferdinand Kolarik, 83, Austrian footballer (Admira Wien, national team).
 Thanasis Papazoglou, 67, Greek footballer (PAS Giannina, national team).
 7 January –
 Alex Apolinário, 24, Brazilian footballer (Alverca, Cruzeiro), cardiac arrest.
 Cassim Louis, 73, Saint Lucian football manager (national team).
 8 January –
 Otto Geisert, 81, German footballer (Karlsruhe, Kaiserslautern).
 Marian Kondratowicz, 79, Polish footballer (Odra Opole).
 Wojciech Przybylski, 81, Polish football player (Broń Radom) and manager (Lechia Gdańsk, Al-Jaish).
 9 January – 
 Harry Brüll, 85, Dutch footballer (Rapid JC Heerlen, Fortuna Sittard, national team).
 Llorenç Rifé, 82, Spanish football player (Barcelona, Deportivo de La Coruña).
 10 January –
 Arthur Bramley, 91, English footballer (Mansfield Town).
 Pedro Casado, 83, Spanish footballer (Real Madrid, Sabadell, national team).
 Tosh Chamberlain, 86, English footballer (Fulham, Dover Athletic, Gravesend and Northfleet).
 Avelino Chaves, 89, Spanish football player (Real Zaragoza) and executive.
 Tony Gregory, 83, English footballer (Luton Town, Watford).
 Bobby Kellard, 77, English football player (Southend United, Portsmouth, Crystal Palace) and manager.
 Christopher Maboulou, 30, French-Congolese footballer (Châteauroux, Bastia, PAS Giannina), heart attack.
 Josep Antoni Noya, 81, Spanish footballer (Sabadell, Atlético Madrid).
 Walter Taibo, 89, Uruguayan footballer (Huracán, Nacional, national team).
 11 January – 
 Fabio Enzo, 74, Italian footballer (Roma, Cesena, Novara), complications from COVID-19.
 Gothard Kokott, 77, Polish football manager (Raków Częstochowa, Ruch Radzionków).
 12 January – Per Martinsen, 84, Norwegian footballer (Lisleby, Fredrikstad, national team).
 14 January – José Luis Caballero, 65, Mexican Olympic footballer (1976).
 15 January – 
 Geoff Barnett, 74, English footballer (Everton, Arsenal, Minnesota Kicks), complications from COVID-19.
 Aleksandr Nikitin, 59, Russian football player (Torpedo Volzhsky, SKA Rostov-on-Don, Rotor Volgograd) and manager.
 16 January – 
György Handel, 61, Hungarian footballer (MTK-VM, Rába ETO, national team), COVID-19.
Sergei Rodin, 39, Russian footballer (CSKA Moscow, Sportakademklub Moscow, Sokol Saratov).
 17 January – Roger Machin, 94, French football referee.
 18 January – Dani Shmulevich-Rom, 80, Israeli footballer (Maccabi Haifa, national team), cancer.
 19 January – 
José Alves, 86, Brazilian footballer (Botafogo, Corinthians, América).
Gordon Galley, 90, English footballer (Darlington, Sheffield Wednesday) and police officer.
 Gustavo Peña, 78, Mexican football player (Monterrey, national team) and manager (Leones Negros), COVID-19.
 20 January – 
John Jeffers, 52, English footballer (Port Vale, Shrewsbury Town, Stockport County).
Peter Swan, 84, English footballer (Sheffield Wednesday, Matlock Town, national team).
 21 January – Calixto Avena, 77, Colombian footballer (Millonarios, Atlético Junior, national team), COVID-19.
 22 January – 
Luton Shelton, 35, Jamaican footballer (Harbour View, Vålerenga, national team), complications from amyotrophic lateral sclerosis.
Johnny Williams, 73, English footballer (Watford, Colchester United, Margate).
 23 January – 
Abukari Gariba, 81, Ghanaian Olympic footballer (1968, 1972).
Peter Gillott, 85, English footballer (Barnsley, Chelmsford City).
 24 January – 
Jóhannes Eðvaldsson, 70, Icelandic footballer (Celtic, Motherwell, national team).
Barrie Mitchell, 73, Scottish footballer (Dunfermline Athletic, Aberdeen, Tranmere Rovers).
Ron Rafferty, 86, English footballer (Grimsby Town, Aldershot, Portsmouth).
Notable Brazilians who died in the 2021 Palmas FR plane crash:
Marcus Molinari, 23, footballer (Tupi, Ipatinga, Tupynambás).
Guilherme Noé, 28, footballer (Batatais, Rio Preto, Ipatinga).
Ranule, 27, footballer (Atlético Itapemirim, Democrata, Resende).
 25 January – 
 David Bright, 64, Botswanan football manager (Mogoditshane Fighters, Cape Town, national team), complications from COVID-19.
 Maryan Synakowski, 84, French footballer (Sedan, Union SG, national team).
 26 January – 
 John Mortimore, 86, English football player (Chelsea) and manager (Benfica, Belenenses).
 Jozef Vengloš, Slovak footballer and manager (born 1936)
 27 January – 
 José Cruz, 68, Honduran footballer (Motagua, Real España, national team), COVID-19.
 Mehrdad Minavand, 45, Iranian football player (Pas, Persepolis, national team) and manager, COVID-19.
 28 January – 
Leslie Brown, 84, English footballer (Dulwich Hamlet).
Eddie Connachan, 85, Scottish footballer (Dunfermline Athletic, Middlesbrough, national team).
Yvon Douis, 85, French footballer (Lille, AS Monaco, national team), COVID-19.
John Grant, 89, Scottish footballer (Hibernian, national team).
 29 January –
Roberto Frojuello, 83, Brazilian footballer (São Paulo, River Plate, Colo-Colo).
Varol Ürkmez, 84, Turkish footballer (Beşiktaş, Altay, national team).
 31 January – 
John Gibbons, 95, English footballer (QPR, Ipswich Town, Tottenham Hotspur), COVID-19.
Justo Tejada, 88, Spanish footballer (Barcelona, Real Madrid, national team).

February

 1 February  – Peter Hindley, 76, English footballer (Nottingham Forest, Coventry City, Peterborough United), dementia.
 3 February  – 
 Ali Ansarian, 43, Iranian footballer (Persepolis, Shahrdari Tabriz, national team), COVID-19.
 Benito Boldi, 86, Italian footballer (Catania, Cesena, Biellese), complications from COVID-19.
 Nilson Borges, 79, Brazilian footballer (Portuguesa-SP, Atlético Paranaense).
 Norbert Owona, 70, Cameroonian footballer (Union Douala, national team).
 4 February  –
 Santiago García, 30, Uruguayan footballer (Nacional, River Plate-UY, Godoy Cruz), suicide by gunshot.
 Ben Hannigan, 77, Irish footballer (Shelbourne, Wrexham, Dundalk).
 5 February  – Wim Vrösch, 75, Dutch football player (Sparta Rotterdam, Fortuna Sittard) and manager (Metalurh Donetsk).
 6 February  – 
 Abdelkhalek Louzani, 75, Moroccan footballer (Anderlecht, K.V.V. Crossing Elewijt, Olympic Charleroi), COVID-19.
 Columb McKinley, 70, Scottish footballer (Airdrieonians, Dumbarton).
 Ken Roberts, 84, Welsh football player (Aston Villa) and manager (Chester City).
 7 February  – 
 Mario Osbén, 70, Chilean footballer (Colo-Colo, Cobreloa, national team), heart attack.
 Lula Pereira, 64, Brazilian footballer (Sport Recife, Santa Cruz, Ceará) and manager (Flamengo). 
 Whelan Ward, 91, English footballer (Bradford City, King's Lynn).
 8 February  – 
 Tony Collins, 94, English football player (Sheffield Wednesday, Watford) and manager (Rochdale).
 Graham Day, 67, English footballer (Bristol Rovers, Portland Timbers).
 9 February  – Yisa Sofoluwe, 53, Nigerian footballer (Abiola Babes, national team), COVID-19.
 10 February  –
 Dai Davies, 72, Welsh footballer (Wrexham, Everton, national team), pancreatic cancer.
 Pachín, 82, Spanish football player (Real Madrid, national team) and manager (Hércules).
 11 February  – 
 John James, 72, English footballer (Port Vale, Chester City, Tranmere Rovers).
 John Kirkham, 79, English footballer (Wolverhampton Wanderers, Peterborough United, Exeter City).
 Mladen Vranković, 83, Croatian football player (HNK Rijeka, Kansas City Spurs) and manager (NK Orijent).
 12 February  – 
 Gianni Beschin, 67, Italian football referee.
 Celso Güity, 63, Honduran footballer (Marathón, Sula, national team), cancer.
 Norman Jukes, 88, English footballer (York City).
 Maurizio Mattei, 78, Italian football referee, COVID-19.
 13 February  – Alan Woan, 90, English footballer (Northampton Town, Crystal Palace, Aldershot).
 15 February  – 
 Leopoldo Luque, 71, Argentine footballer (River Plate, Unión, national team), world champion (1978), COVID-19.
 Kenny McDevitt, 91, English footballer (Tranmere Rovers).
 José Pedrozo, 38, Paraguayan footballer (Antofagasta, San Marcos de Arica), traffic collision.
 17 February  – 
 Özcan Arkoç, 81, Turkish footballer (Hamburger SV, Beşiktaş, national team).
 John Manning, 80, English footballer (Tranmere Rovers, Barnsley).
 Martí Vergés, 86, Spanish footballer (España Industrial, Barcelona, national team).
 19 February  – 
 Faisal Abdulaziz, 53, Bahraini footballer (Muharraq, national team).
 Ebba Andersson, 85, Swedish footballer (Öxabäcks, national team).
 Fousiya Mampatta, 52, Indian football player and manager, cancer.
 Silvio Sérafin, 82, French footballer (FC Nancy, Angers SCO, Angoulême-Soyaux Charente).
 20 February  – Mauro Bellugi, 71, Italian footballer (Inter Milan, Bologna, national team), complications from COVID-19.
 22 February  – Jack Bolton, 79, Scottish footballer (Ipswich Town, Raith Rovers, Dumbarton).
 23 February  – 
 Harry Clark, 88, English footballer (Darlington, Hartlepool United).
 Willy Ta Bi, 21, Ivorian footballer (national team), liver cancer.
 25 February  – 
 Albert Bers, 89, Belgian footballer (Sint-Truidense V.V.) and football coach (Belgium women's national team).
 Rafi Levi, 83, Israeli footballer (Maccabi Tel Aviv, Sydney Hakoah, national team).
 Finn Sterobo, 87, Danish footballer (Odense Boldklub, national team).
 Ton Thie, 76, Dutch footballer (ADO Den Haag, San Francisco Golden Gate Gales).
 26 February  – Horacio Moráles, 77, Argentine Olympic footballer (1964).
 27 February  – Dante Crippa, 83, Italian footballer (Brescia, Juventus, S.P.A.L.), complications from COVID-19.
 28 February – Glenn Roeder, 65, English footballer and manager (Queens Park Rangers, Newcastle United, West Ham United), brain tumour.

March

 3 March  – Wilhelm Eliassen, 85, Norwegian footballer (Frigg Oslo FK, national team).
 4 March  – 
 Phil Chisnall, 78, English footballer (Manchester United, Liverpool, Southend United).
 Tengiz Sichinava, 48, Georgian football player (Dinamo Batumi, national team) and manager (Gagra).
 Willie Whigham, 81, Scottish footballer (Albion Rovers, Falkirk, Middlesbrough), pneumonia.
 5 March  – Mickey Lewis, 56, English footballer (West Bromwich Albion, Derby County, Oxford United), cancer.
 6 March  – 
 Franco Acosta, 25, Uruguayan footballer (Fénix, Villarreal B, Plaza Colonia), drowned.
 Konrad Kornek, 84, Polish footballer (Odra Opole, national team).
 7 March  – Mirko Pavinato, 86, Italian footballer (Bologna, Vicenza), kidney problems aggravated by COVID-19.
 9 March  – 
 Agustín Balbuena, 75, Argentine footballer (Colón de Santa Fe, Independiente).
 Micky Brown, 76, English footballer (Millwall, Colchester United).
 Bob Graves, 78, English footballer (Lincoln City).
 Marino Lombardo, 70, Italian footballer (Torino, Cesena, Pistoiese), heart attack.
 Tommy Troelsen, 80, Danish footballer, Olympic silver medalist (1960) and television presenter.
 10 March  – 
 Mario Boccalatte, 87, Italian footballer (Biellese, Reggiana).
 Ron Phoenix, 91, English footballer (Manchester City, Rochdale).
 11 March  – Jimmy Stevenson, 74, Scottish footballer (Hibernian, Southend United, Margate).
 12 March  – 
 Gérard Aygoui, 84, French footballer (Olympique de Marseille, national team).
 Uruguay Graffigna, 73, Uruguayan-Chilean footballer (San Luis de Quillota, Los Angeles Aztecs, PEC Zwolle), complications from COVID-19 and Alzheimer's disease.
 13 March  – Rostyslav Bahdasarov, 27, Ukrainian footballer (Kolos Kovaliva, Stal Dniprodzerzhynsk), heart disease.
 15 March  – 
 Daniel Eon, 81, French footballer (Nantes, national team).
 Gilmar Fubá, 45, Brazilian footballer (Corinthians), bone marrow cancer.
 16 March – 
 Micky Dulin, 85, English footballer (Tottenham Hotspur).
 Aarón Gamal, 62, Mexican footballer (Deportivo Neza, Tigres, national team), heart disease.
 Ahmed Mghirbi, 74, Tunisian footballer (Stade Tunisien).
 Erhan Önal, 63, Turkish footballer (Bayern Munich, Galatasaray, national team).
 Patrick Viot, 68, French footballer (US Orléans).
 Laurent Zahui, 60, Ivorian footballer (national team).
 17 March – Steve Jagielka, 43, English footballer (Shrewsbury Town, Accrington Stanley), drug toxicity.
 20 March – Peter Lorimer, 74, Scottish footballer (Leeds United, national team).
 21 March – Terry Melling, 81, English footballer (Slough Town, Newcastle United, Mansfield Town).
 22 March – 
 Barnabas Imenger, 45, Nigerian footballer (Lobi Stars, national team).
 Alan Slough, 73, English footballer (Luton Town, Fulham, Peterborough United).
 Frank Worthington, 72, English footballer (Huddersfield Town, Leicester City, national team).
 24 March – 
 Enrique Chazarreta, 73, Argentine footballer (San Lorenzo, Avignon, national team).
 Derek Hawksworth, 93, English footballer (Bradford City, Sheffield United, Huddersfield Town).
 26 March – Hossein Khodaparast, 82, Iranian Olympic footballer (1964).
 27 March – 
 Alex Kiddie, 93, Scottish footballer (Aberdeen).
 Derek Ufton, 92, English cricketer (Kent) and footballer (Charlton Athletic, national team).
 30 March – Maurizio Moretti, 76, Italian footballer (S.P.A.L.), COVID-19.
 31 March – 
 Lee Collins, 32, English footballer (Port Vale, Northampton Town, Mansfield Town), suicide by hanging.
 Erwin Piechowiak, 84, German footballer (HSV).

April

 2 April  – Valentin Afonin, 81, Russian footballer (SKA Rostov-on-Don, CSKA Moscow).
 3 April  – Remus Câmpeanu, 82, Romanian footballer (Universitatea Cluj).
 4 April  – 
 Adolf Kabo, 61, Indonesian footballer (Perseman Manokwari, national team).
 Alfonso Quijano, 78, Ecuadorian footballer (Barcelona S.C., national team).
 8 April  – 
 Doug Holden, 90, English footballer (Bolton Wanderers, Preston North End, national team).
 Ton van den Hurk, 88, Dutch footballer (FC Eindhoven, VVV-Venlo, Sittardia).
 Ñito, 81, Spanish footballer (Tenerife, Valencia, Granada).
 Horst Trimhold, 80, German footballer (Borussia Dortmund, FSV Frankfurt, national team).
 9 April  – 
 Maryan Bakalarczyk, 93, Polish-Belgian footballer (R.F.C. Tilleur, R. Charleroi S.C., Standard Liège).
 Daniel Benítez, 33, Venezuelan footballer (Deportivo Táchira, Deportivo La Guaira), cancer.
 Roman Kanafotskyi, 83, Ukrainian footballer (Dnipro, Kryvbas Kryvyi Rih, Elektrometalurh-NZF Nikopol).
 Wolfgang Kaniber, 81, German footballer (Fortuna Düsseldorf, VfL Osnabrück, RC Strasbourg).
 Julien Van Roosbroeck, 85, Belgian footballer (national team).
 11 April  – 
 Colin Baker, 86, Welsh footballer (Cardiff City, national team).
 Füzuli Javadov, 70, Azerbaijani footballer (SKA Rostov-on-Don, Neftçi PFK, Daugava Riga), COVID-19.
 12 April  – Peter Goy, 82, English footballer (Arsenal, Southend United, Watford).
 13 April  – 
 Jamal Al-Qabendi, 62, Kuwaiti footballer (Kazma, national team), complications from diabetes.
 Hans-Dieter Tippenhauer, 77, German footballer (Fortuna Düsseldorf, Arminia Bielefeld, Borussia Dortmund).
 15 April  – Poul Bilde, 83, Danish footballer (Vejle, national team).
 16 April  – 
 Hussain Ahmed, 89, Indian Olympic footballer (1956), COVID-19.
 Claude Jamet, 91, French footballer (LB Châteauroux).
 17 April  – 
 Mario Pini, 82, Uruguayan footballer (Montevideo Wanderers).
 Wayne Talkes, 68, English footballer (Southampton, AFC Bournemouth).
 18 April  – Tremaine Stewart, 33, Jamaican footballer (Aalesund, Waterhouse, national team).
 19 April  – 
 Willy van der Kuijlen, 74, Dutch footballer (PSV, MVV, national team), complications from Alzheimer's disease.
 Viktor Shuvalov, 97, Russian ice hockey player and footballer (VVS Moscow), Olympic champion (1956), COVID-19.
 Marin Voinea, 85, Romanian footballer (Progresul București, Siderurgistul Galați, national team).
 20 April  – 
 Listianto Raharjo, 50, Indonesian footballer (Pelita Jaya, national team), heart attack.
 Alfred Teinitzer, 91, Austrian footballer (SK Rapid Wien, LASK Linz, national team).
 Panagiotis Xoblios, 25, Greek footballer (Veria, Panegialios, Kallithea), heart attack.
 21 April  – 
 Alfredo Graciani, 56, Argentine footballer (Boca Juniors, Racing Club, Deportivo Español), heart attack.
 Gerry Mackey, 87, Irish footballer (Shamrock Rovers).
 22 April  – 
 Jean-Pierre Kress, 91, French footballer (national team).
 Roy Strandbakke, 90, Norwegian footballer (Raufoss, national team).
 23 April  – Tuncay Becedek, 78, Turkish footballer (Fenerbahçe, İzmirspor, national team).
 25 April  – 
 Ian Hamilton, 80, English footballer (Bristol Rovers).
 Hamid Jasemian, 84, Iranian footballer (Shahin, Persepolis), COVID-19.
 26 April  – Peter Gelson, 79, English footballer (Brentford, Hillingdon Borough, Hounslow).
 28 April  – 
 Clyde Leon, 37, Trinidadian footballer (Arima Fire, W Connection, national team).
 Steve Perks, 58, English footballer (Shrewsbury Town).
 Chelato Uclés, 80, Honduran footballer (Atlético Español) and coach (Real España, national team), heart attack.
 29 April  – 
 Frank Brogan, 78, Scottish footballer (Celtic, Ipswich Town, Halifax Town).
 Zhang Enhua, 48, Chinese footballer (Dalian Wanda, Grimsby Town, national team).

May

 1 May  – Ricardo Alberto Ramírez, 48, Argentine footballer, complications from COVID-19.
 2 May – 
 Lolly Debattista, 91, Maltese footballer (Floriana, Ħamrun Spartans, Valletta).
 Andrzej Możejko, 72, Polish footballer (Widzew Łódź).
 3 May – 
 Rafael Albrecht, 79, Argentine footballer (San Lorenzo, Club León, national team), COVID-19.
 Alan Keely, 38, Irish footballer (Shelbourne).
 Kamel Tchalabi, 74, Algerian footballer (USM Alger, national team).
 4 May – 
 Steve Conroy, 64, English footballer (Sheffield United, Rotherham United, Rochdale).
 Omar Hugo Gómez, 65, Argentine footballer (Quilmes Atlético Club), COVID-19.
 Alan McLoughlin, 54, Irish footballer (Portsmouth, Swindon Town, Republic of Ireland) cancer.
 5 May – 
 Abelardo González, 76, Spanish footballer (UP Langreo, Sporting de Gijón, Valencia CF).
 Bertil Johansson, 86, Swedish footballer (IFK Göteborg, national team).
 6 May – Christophe Revault, 49, French footballer (Paris Saint-Germain, Toulouse, Le Havre).
 7 May – 
Martín Pando, 86, Argentine footballer (Argentinos Juniors, River Plate, national team).
John Sludden, 56, Scottish footballer (St Johnstone, Ayr United).
 8 May – 
 Georgi Dimitrov, 62, Bulgarian football player (CSKA Sofia, national team) and manager (Marek Dupnitsa), cancer.
 Sanda Oumarou, 38, Cameroonian footballer (Coton Sport, Al Masry).
 9 May – James Dean, 35, English footballer (Stalybridge Celtic, Chorley, Halifax Town). (body discovered on this date)
 10 May – 
 Sami Hasan Al Nash, 64, Yemeni football manager (national team), COVID-19.
 Fortunato Franco, 84, Indian footballer (Salgaocar, Maharashtra, national team).
 Néstor Montelongo, 66, Uruguayan footballer (national team), 1983 Copa América winner.
 12 May – 
 Jiří Feureisl, 89, Czech footballer (FC Karlovy Vary) and ice hockey player.
 Dixie Hale, 85, Irish footballer (Swansea Town, Barrow, Workington, Watford).
 Vadim Logunov, 53, Russian footballer (Metallurg Lipetsk, APK Azov, Krystal Kherson).
 Ton Pansier, 74, Dutch footballer (XerxesDZB, SV SVV).
 Ivanildo Rozenblad, 24, Surinamese footballer (S.V. Robinhood).
 13 May –
 Ian Brusasco, 92, Australian soccer administrator (president of the Australian Soccer Federation, vice president of the Oceania Football Confederation).
 Nelson Marcenaro, 68, Uruguayan footballer (national team), 1980 Mundialito winner, heart attack.
 Eigil Misser, 87, Danish footballer (B 1913, national team).
 14 May – Torkild Brakstad, 75, Norwegian football player (Molde, national team) and manager (Tromsø).
 16 May – 
 Hüseyin Er, 36, Turkish-British footballer (İzmirspor), heart attack. (death announced on this date)
 Samir Hadjaoui, 42, Algerian footballer (ASO Chlef, ES Sétif, national team).
 Rildo da Costa Menezes, 79, Brazilian football player (Botafogo, national team) and manager (California Kickers).
 19 May – 
 Serhiy Ferenchak, 37, Ukrainian footballer (Khimik Krasnoperekopsk, Sevastopol, SKChF Sevastopol).
 Josep Franch, 77, Spanish footballer (FC Barcelona, CE Sabadell FC).
 Guillermo Sepúlveda, 86, Mexican footballer (Guadalajara, Oro, national team).
 20 May – 
 Len Badger, 75, English footballer (Sheffield United).
 Chris Chilton, 77, English footballer (Hull City, Coventry City), complications from dementia.
 Sándor Puhl, 65, Hungarian football referee, complications from COVID-19.
 Eric Winstanley, 76, English footballer (Barnsley, Chesterfield).
 21 May – Dwayne Sandy, 32, Vincentian footballer (Saint Vincent and the Grenadines), gunshot.
 22 May – 
 Francesc Arnau, 46, Spanish football player (Barcelona, Málaga) and executive (Real Oviedo), suicide.
 Mels Kenetaev, 75, Kazakh footballer (Dinamo Tselinograd).
 25 May – 
 Alfonso Barasoain, 63, Spanish football player and manager (Barakaldo, Eibar, Lemona).
 Arturo Gentili, 85, Italian footballer (Atalanta B.C., Varese Calcio, Triestina Calcio).
 George Patterson, 86, English footballer (Hull City, York City).
 Amichai Shoham, 99, Israeli footballer (Hapoel Petah Tikva F.C., national team).
 26 May – Tarcisio Burgnich, 82, Italian footballer (Internazionale, national team) and manager.
 27 May – 
 Karl-Heinz Heddergott, 94, German football manager (FC Köln, Egypt national team, Oman national team).
 Zdenko Vukasović, 79, Croatian footballer (Anderlecht, Cercle Brugge, Lokeren).
 28 May – Zablon Amanaka, 45, Kenyan footballer (Željezničar Sarajevo, Mahakama, national team).
 30 May – 
 Tonnie van As, 93, Dutch footballer (SBV Vitesse).
 John Carpenter, 84, Irish referee and player (St Patrick's Athletic).
 31 May – Colin Appleton, 85, English football player (Leicester City, Charlton Athletic) and manager (Swansea City).

June

 1 June  – 
Silvio Francesconi, 68, Italian football player and manager, COVID-19.
Adnan Al Sharqi, 79, Lebanese football player (Al Ansar) and manager (Al Nahda, national team).
Samadagha Shikhlarov, 65, Azerbaijani footballer (Khazar Sumgayit, Neftçi Baku, FK Ganca), traffic collision.
 2 June  – 
Odero Gon, 88, Italian footballer (Palmanova, Udinese, Vittorio Falmec).
Stanislav Lunin, 28, Kazakh footballer (Shakhter Karagandy, Kairat), cardiac arrest.
Giuseppe Perrino, 29, Italian footballer (Ebolitana, Battipagliese, Bellaria Igea Marina), heart attack.
Ottorino Sartor, 75, Peruvian footballer (Defensor Arica, Atlético Chalaco, national team).
 3 June  – 
Alan Miller, 51, English footballer (Arsenal, Middlesbrough, West Bromwich Albion).
Ezio Motta, 90, Italian football referee (Serie A).
Murat Šaran, 71, Bosnian footballer (Sarajevo, Rijeka, Levante).
 4 June  – 
Roberto Depietri, 55, Argentine footballer (Club Olimpo, Deportivo Toluca), COVID-19.
 Roberto Derlin, 78, Italian football player (Genoa, Spezia Calcio) and manager (Sestri Levante).
 Loris Dominissini, 59, Italian football player (Udinese, Reggiana) and manager (Reggiana), COVID-19.
 5 June  – 
 Kelvin Odenigbo, 20, Nigerian footballer (NAF Rockets, Vitebsk), drowned.
 Pedro Taberner, 74, Spanish footballer (RCD Mallorca, Celta de Vigo).
 7 June  – 
 Paul Cahill, 65, English footballer (Portsmouth, California Surf).
 Fulvio Varglien, 85, Italian footballer (Triestina, Livorno, Pordenone).
 Yoo Sang-chul, 49, South Korean footballer (Ulsan Hyundai, Yokohama F. Marinos, national team), pancreatic cancer.
 8 June  – 
 John Angus, 82, English footballer (Burnley, national team).
 Gennadi Syomin, 53, Russian football player (FShM Torpedo Moscow, Fakel Voronezh) and manager (Dynamo Voronezh).
 9 June – Diogo Correa de Oliveira, 38, Brazilian footballer (Flamengo, Kalmar, Hokkaido Consadole Sapporo), traffic collision.
 10 June – 
 Neno, 59, Portuguese footballer (Benfica, Vitória Guimarães, national team), heart attack.
 Gheorghe Staicu, 85, Romanian football player (Steaua București) and manager (Olimpia Satu Mare, Universitatea Cluj).
 15 June – Aleksandr Averyanov, 72, Russian football player (Lokomotiv Moscow) and manager (Okean Nakhodka, Dynamo Saint Petersburg).
 17 June – 
 Mike Burgess, 89, Canadian-born English footballer (AFC Bournemouth).
 Kamil Ferkhanov, 56, Russian footballer (Regar-TadAZ Tursunzoda, Turbostroitel Kaluga, Volga Ulyanovsk), heart attack.
 Robert Lima, 48, Uruguayan football player (Peñarol, Chacarita) and manager (Juticalpa), cardiac arrest.
 Tubilandu Ndimbi, 73, Congolese footballer (AS Vita Club, national team).
 18 June – Giampiero Boniperti, 92, Italian footballer (Juventus, national team) and politician, MEP (1994–1999), heart failure.
 19 June – Spencer Whelan, 49, English footballer (Chester City, Shrewsbury Town).
 20 June – 
 Lucas Pereira, 39, Brazilian footballer (AC Ajaccio), COVID-19.
 Peter Rock, 79, German footballer (FC Carl Zeiss Jena, East Germany).
 Luis del Sol, 86, Spanish footballer (Real Madrid, Juventus, national team) and coach.
 21 June – Jack Bertolini, 87, Scottish footballer (Workington, Brighton & Hove Albion, Stirling Albion).
 22 June – 
 Giancarlo Amadeo, 87, Italian football player (Pro Patria) and manager (Borgosesia).
 Yaroslav Dumanskyi, 61, Ukrainian footballer (Spartak Ivano-Frankivsk, Karpaty Lviv, Dynamo Kyiv).
 Vitaliy Shalychev, 74, Ukrainian football player (Shakhtar Donetsk, Kolhozchi Aşgabat) and coach (FC Ocean Kerch).
 Sergei Shaposhnikov, 98, Russian football player (Ska-Khabarovsk) and manager (CSKA Moscow, SKA Odessa).
 23 June – 
 Bart Van Lancker, 48, Belgian football coach (KV Kortrijk, Sint-Truiden, OH Leuven), cancer.
 Daniel Vélez, 47, Colombian footballer (DIM, Atlético Bucaramanga, Santa Fe), COVID-19.
 24 June – 
 Misheck Chidzambwa, 66, Zimbabwean football player (Dynamos, national team) and manager (Chapungu United).
 Ludwig Müller, 79, German footballer (1. FC Nürnberg, Hertha, West Germany national team).
 Keith Rutter, 89, English footballer (Queens Park Rangers, Colchester United). (death announced on this date)
 Eleazar Soria, 73, Peruvian footballer (Universitario, Independiente, national team) and lawyer.
 25 June – Marcos Ferrufino, 58, Bolivian football player (Club Bolívar, national team) and manager (San José), COVID-19.
 26 June – Jhon Mario Ramírez, 49, Colombian footballer (national team), COVID-19.
 29 June – 
 Jock Aird, 94, Scottish footballer (Burnley, national team).
 Petros Leventakos, 75, Greek footballer (Panachaiki, Ethnikos Piraeus, PAS Giannina).
 Vicky Peretz, 68, Israeli football player (Maccabi Tel Aviv, national team) and manager (Hakoah Amidar Ramat Gan).
 30 June – Inge Danielsson, 80, Swedish footballer (Helsingborg, Ajax, national team).

July

 1 July  – Christian Bottollier, 92, French footballer (FC Nancy).
 2 July  – Giuliano Zoratti, 73, Italian football player (Pro Gorizia) and manager (Reggina, Avellino), cancer.
 3 July  – Waldemar Mühlbächer, 83, German footballer (BFC Dynamo, East Germany national team).
 4 July  – Hans-Jürgen Ripp, 75, German footballer (Hamburger SV, Lüneburger SK).
 5 July  – 
 Franco Gallina, 76, Italian football player (Virtus Entella, Cesena, Genoa) and manager.
 Rubén Israel, 65, Uruguayan football manager (Rentistas, Club Libertad, Barcelona de Ecuador).
 Alfredo Obberti, 75, Argentine footballer (Newell's Old Boys, Grêmio, national team).
 6 July  – Miguel González, 94, Spanish football player (Atlético Madrid, Real Zaragoza, national team) and coach.
 7 July  –
 Józef Gałeczka, 82, Polish footballer (Piast Gliwice, Zagłębie Sosnowiec).
 Smaïn Ibrir, 89, Algerian footballer (Le Havre AC, national team).
 8 July  – 
 Jan Caliński, 72, Polish football manager (Śląsk Wrocław).
 Max Griggs, 82, English footwear and football executive, owner of Dr. Martens and Rushden & Diamonds F.C.
 9 July – Paul Mariner, 68, English footballer (national team, Ipswich Town), brain cancer.
 10 July – 
 Jimmy Gabriel, 80, Scottish football player (Everton, Southampton, national team) and manager.
 Natale Nobili, 85, Italian football player (S.P.A.L., Pro Vercelli, Alessandria) and coach.
 11 July – 
 Dave Dunmore, 87, English footballer (Leyton Orient, York City, Tottenham Hotspur).
 Charlie Gallagher, 80, Scottish-Irish footballer (Celtic, Dumbarton, Ireland national team).
 Ernie Moss, 71, English footballer (Chesterfield, Mansfield Town, Lincoln City).
 Attilio Prior, 86, Italian footballer (Vicenza).
 12 July – 
 Mick Bates, 73, English footballer (Leeds United, Walsall, Bradford City).
 Francisco Caló, 74, Portuguese footballer (Sporting, Tomar, national team).
 Erich Hasenkopf, 86, Austrian footballer (Wiener Sport-Club, national team).
 Wilson Jones, 87, Spanish footballer (Real Madrid, Real Zaragoza, Racing de Santander).
 Mahmoud Shakibi, 94, Iranian footballer (Shahin, national team), heart attack.
 13 July – 
 Cha Gi-suk, 34, South Korean footballer (Gyeongju Citizen, Bucheon FC 1995), kidney failure.
 Alberto Dualib, 101, Brazilian businessman and football executive, chairman of Sport Club Corinthians Paulista (1993–2007).
 14 July – Ken Ronaldson, 75, Scottish footballer (Aberdeen, Bristol Rovers, Gillingham).
 15 July – Keith Bambridge, 85, English footballer (Rotherham United, Darlington, Halifax Town).
 16 July – 
 Yves Boutet, 84, French footballer (Stade Rennais, Lorient).
 Hamid Reza Sadr, 65, Iranian football and film critic, cancer.
 17 July – 
 George Curtis, 82, English football player (Coventry 

City, Aston Villa) and manager (Coventry City).
 Williams Martínez, 38, Uruguayan footballer (Defensor Sporting, Cerro, national team), suicide.
 Milan Živadinović, 76, Serbian football player (Vardar, Rijeka, Crvenka) and manager.
 18 July – Jeff Barmby, 78, English footballer (York City, Goole Town, Scarborough).
 19 July – Kurt Clemens, 95, German footballer (1. FC Saarbrücken, FC Nancy, Saarland national team).
 20 July –
 Daniel Escudero, 79, Chilean footballer (Everton, Unión La Calera, San Luis de Quillota).
 Billy Reid, 83, Scottish footballer (Motherwell, Airdrie).
 Noureddine Saâdi, 71, Algerian football manager (JS Kabylie, Al Ahli Tripoli, ASO Chlef), COVID-19.
 Peter Willis, 83, English football referee.
 21 July – Tommy Leishman, 83, Scottish footballer (Liverpool, Stranraer, St Mirren).
 22 July – 
 Terry Neill, 80, Northern Irish footballer (Arsenal, Hull City, national team) and manager (Hull City, Tottenham Hotspur, Arsenal, national team).
 Ian Palmer, 55, South African footballer (Orlando Pirates), COVID-19 complications.
 Mike Smith, 83, English football player (Corinthian Casuals) and manager (Wales national team, Egypt national team). (death announced on this date)
 23 July – Andy Higgins, 61, English footballer (Chester City, Port Vale, Rochdale).
 26 July – 
 Ally Dawson, 63, Scottish footballer (Rangers, national team).
 Ivan Toplak, 89, Serbian football player (Red Star Belgrade) and manager (Oakland Clippers, Yugoslavia national team).
 27 July – 
 Tommy Connolly, 74, Irish football player (Dundalk) and manager.
 Einar Bruno Larsen, 81, Norwegian footballer (Vålerenga, national team) and Olympic ice hockey player (1964).
 28 July – 
 Porfirio Armando Betancourt, 63, Honduran footballer (Strasbourg, national team), COVID-19.
 André Catimba, 74, Brazilian footballer (Ypiranga, Vitória, Grêmio).
 Volodymyr Dykyi, 59, Ukrainian football player (Karpaty Lviv, Nyva Ternopil) and manager (Volyn Lutsk).
 Krzysztof Karpiński, 67, Polish footballer (Śląsk Wrocław).
 Derek Tomkinson, 90, English footballer (Port Vale, Macclesfield Town, Crewe Alexandra).
 29 July – Zizinho, 59, Brazilian footballer (Club América, Club Necaxa, Monterrey), COVID-19.
 30 July – Italo Vassallo, 80, Ethiopian footballer (Cotton Factory Club, national team).
 31 July –
 Terry Cooper, 77, English footballer (Leeds United, Middlesbrough, Bristol City, Bristol Rovers, national team) and manager (Bristol Rovers, Bristol City, Birmingham City, Exeter City).
 Yeo Hyo-jin, 38, South Korean footballer (Gimcheon Sangmu, Tochigi SC, Goyang Zaicro), cancer.

August
 
 1 August – Eddie Presland, 78, English footballer (West Ham United, Crystal Palace), cancer.
 2 August – 
 Luigi Paleari, 79, Italian footballer (Como 1907, A.S.D. Fanfulla).
 Antonio de la Torre Villalpando, 69, Mexican footballer, (Club América, national team).
 3 August – 
 Jergé Hoefdraad, 35, Dutch footballer (RKC Waalwijk, Almere City, Telstar), complications from gunshot wounds.
 Godfred Yeboah, 41, Ghanaian footballer (Asante Kotoko, All Stars, national team).
 5 August – S. S. Narayan, 86, Indian Olympic footballer (1956, 1960), cardiac arrest.
 6 August – 
 Francesco Dibenedetto, 80, Italian football manager (Matera Calcio, Bisceglie, U.S.D. Città di Fasano).
 Salvador Escrihuela, 70, Spanish footballer (Sabadell, Granada, Alavés).
 7 August – 
 Julio César Anderson, 73, Guatemalan footballer (C.S.D. Municipal, national team).
 Robbie Cooke, 64, English footballer (Peterborough United, Cambridge United, Brentford), cancer.
 10 August – 
 Michel Le Flochmoan, 69, French football player and manager (Sedan, R.E. Virton, F91 Dudelange).
 Dudley Price, 89, Welsh footballer (Swansea City, Hull City, Southend United).
 12 August – Alfonso Sepúlveda, 82, Chilean footballer (Club Universidad de Chile).
 13 August – 
 Franck Berrier, 37, French football player (Cannes, Zulte Waregem, Oostende) and manager, heart attack.
 Bobby Stein, 82, Scottish footballer (Raith Rovers, Montrose).
 15 August – Gerd Müller, German footballer (born 1945)
 17 August – Paulão, 51, Angolan footballer (Benfica, Espinho, national team).
 21 August – Arthur Smith, 106, English footballer (Bury, Leicester City).
 24 August – Wilfried Van Moer, 76, Belgian footballer (Standard Liège, national team) and manager (national team), cerebral haemorrhage.
 27 August – Johnny Williamson, 92, English footballer (Manchester City, Blackburn Rovers).

September 

 2 September – Paul Chillan, 85, French footballer (Nîmes Olympique, national team).
 19 September – Jimmy Greaves, English footballer (born 1940)
 20 September – Ken Worden, 78, English coach (Malaysia, Singapore).
 21 September – Romano Fogli, 83, Italian footballer (Torino, Bologna, AC Milan, Catania, national team).

October 

 1 October – 
 Fred Hill, 81, English footballer (Bolton Wanderers, national team).
 Paul Linger, 46, English footballer (Charlton Athletic, Brighton & Hove Albion), pancreatic cancer.
 Sune Sandbring, 93, Swedish footballer (Malmö FF, national team).
 Brian Sherratt, 77, English footballer (Oxford United, Stoke City, Barnsley).
 Reg Beresford, 100, English footballer (Aston Villa, Birmingham City, Crystal Palace).
 3 October – Bernard Tapie, 78, French businessman (president of Olympique de Marseille 1986–1994), stomach cancer. 
 16 October – George Kinnell, 83, Scottish footballer (Aberdeen, Stoke City, Sunderland).

November 

 1 November – Poerio Mascella, 71, Italian footballer (Varese, Ternana, Pistoiese).
 4 November – 
Amela Fetahović, 35, Bosnian footballer (SFK 2000, Spartak Subotica, national team), car crash.
Jack Vitty, 98, English footballer (Workington, Brighton & Hove Albion).
 23 November – Riuler, 23, Brazilian footballer (Shonan Bellmare).
 26 November – Doug Cowie, 95, Scottish footballer (national team, Dundee, Greenock Morton)
 28 November – Johnny Hills, 87, English footballer (Tottenham Hotspur).

December
 
 2 December – Tom McGarry, 74, Irish footballer (Limerick, Cork Celtic).
 3 December – Horst Eckel, German footballer (born 1932)
 8 December – Alfredo Moreno, 41, Argentine footballer (Necaxa, San Luis, Tijuana), intestinal cancer.
 20 December – 
Norberto Boggio, 90, Argentine footballer (Banfield, San Lorenzo de Almagro, Atlante, national team).
Heinz Bigler, 72, Swiss footballer (FC St. Gallen) and manager (FC St. Gallen, FC Schaffhausen, FC Gossau, FC Winterthur).
 26 December – 
 Dorval, 86, Brazilian footballer (Santos, Racing, Palmeiras, Atlético Paranaense, national team).
 Diego Montiel, 25, Argentine footballer (Atlético de Rafaela), meningitis.
 28 December – 
Hugo Maradona, 52, Argentine footballer (Argentinos Juniors, Rayo Vallecano), heart attack.
Tibi, 70, Portuguese footballer (Porto, national team).
 29 December – Christian Gyan, 43, Ghanaian footballer (Feyenoord)

References

External links
 

 
Association football by year